Phu Wiang is a locality in Thailand's Khon Kaen Province named after its main feature, the Phu Wiang mountains. The name may also refer to:

Phu Wiang District, the district previously surrounding the area
Wiang Kao District, the original population centre split off from (new) Phu Wiang District
Phu Wiang Dinosaur Museum
Phu Wiang National Park